SR4 may refer to:
 Matich SR4, a sports car
 Saints Row IV, a video game
 Sergio Ramos, a Spanish professional footballer
 State Road 4 or State Route 4; see List of highways numbered 4
 The fourth iteration of Solar Roadways' panels
 SR4 - Sportsredigering rom nr. 4